The mottled grouper (Mycteroperca rubra) is a species of marine ray-finned fish, a grouper from the subfamily Epinephelinae which is part of the family Serranidae, which also includes the anthias and sea basses. It is found in the eastern Atlantic Ocean and the Mediterranean Sea.

Description
The mottled grouper has an oblong, compressed body which has a depth which is less than the length of its head, its standard length is 2.8 to 3.2 times its depth. The preopercle has a serrated margin with the serrations being enlarged at its angle, where there is a rounded lobe below an incision into the margin. The dorsal fin contains 11 spines and 15-17 soft rays while the anal fin contains 3 spines and 11-12 soft rays. They are usually reddish brown in colour, often mottled with black or pale grey spots and having a black streak above the upper jaw. The juveniles have a black saddle blotch on the caudal peduncle.

Distribution
The mottle grouper is found in the eastern Atlantic Ocean and parts of the Mediterranean Sea. In the eastern Atlantic, it is found from southern Portugal and Spain, along the western coast of Africa as far south as Angola. It was formerly found in the southern Mediterranean from southern Spain and Morocco to Egypt and Israel but it has been expanding its range and is now found as far north as Provence in France and the Adriatic Sea. It is absent from the Black Sea and records from the Macaronesian Islands are misidentifications of Island grouper (Mycteroperca fusca) and records from Brazil are similarly misidentifications of the comb grouper M. acutirostris.

Habitat and biology
It readily takes to artificial reefs such as shipwrecks off Sicily. Juveniles are usually found in shallower inshore waters. It feeds on molluscs and small fishes. The females reach sexual maturity  at a total length of about  around four and five years of age. Spawning aggregations have been recorded off Israel, Senegal, Turkey and Corsica.

Parasites

As most fish, the mottled grouper harbours a variety of parasites. These include the diplectanid monogenean Pseudorhabdosynochus regius on the gills  and the philometrid nematode Philometra inexpectatata in the gonad.

Taxonomy
The mottled grouper was first formally described in 1793 as Epinephelus ruber by the German naturalist Marcus Elieser Bloch (1723-1799) with the type locality given as "Japan", probably an error for Europe or the Mediterranean.

Utilisation
The mottled grouper is not caught commercially because of its scarcity in the Mediterranean but is more commonly caught off Africa.

References 

Mycteroperca
Fish of Europe
Fish of Israel
Fish described in 1793
Taxonomy articles created by Polbot